Kid Indestructible is the debut extended play album by Australian punk/rock band 28 Days. It was the first release on the newly created Sputnik Records; after being signed to Mushroom label in late 1998. Kid Indestructible was released in May 1999 and peaked at number 69 on the ARIA Charts. The tracks "Kool" and "La Tune" received radio promotional release.

At the ARIA Music Awards of 1999, Kalju Tonuma was nominated for ARIA Award for Engineer of the Year for his work on this EP.

Track listing

Charts

Release history

References

1999 debut EPs
EPs by Australian artists
28 Days (band) albums